Scott A. Vanstone was a mathematician and cryptographer in the University of Waterloo Faculty of Mathematics.  He was a member of the school's Centre for Applied Cryptographic Research, and was also a founder of the cybersecurity company Certicom.  He received his PhD in 1974 at the University of Waterloo, and for about a decade worked principally in combinatorial design theory, finite geometry, and finite fields.  In the 1980s he started working in cryptography.  An early result of Vanstone (joint with Ian Blake, R. Fuji-Hara, and Ron Mullin) was an improved algorithm for computing discrete logarithms in binary fields, which inspired Don Coppersmith to develop his famous exp(n^{1/3+ε}) algorithm (where n is the degree of the field).

Vanstone was one of the first to see the commercial potential of Elliptic Curve Cryptography (ECC), and much of his subsequent work was devoted to developing ECC algorithms, protocols, and standards.  In 1985 he co-founded Certicom, which later became the chief developer and promoter of ECC.

Vanstone authored or coauthored five widely used books and almost two hundred research articles, and he held several patents.
He was a Fellow of the Royal Society of Canada and a Fellow of the International Association for Cryptologic Research. In 2001 he won the RSA Award for Excellence in Mathematics, and in 2009 he received the Ontario Premier's Catalyst Award for Lifetime Achievement in Innovation.

He died on March 2, 2014, shortly after a cancer diagnosis.

Bibliography

See also
 List of University of Waterloo people

References
Notes

External links 
 Handbook of Applied Cryptography (Free download)
 DBLP publication list

Modern cryptographers
University of Waterloo alumni
Academic staff of the University of Waterloo
1947 births
2014 deaths
20th-century Canadian mathematicians
21st-century Canadian mathematicians
People associated with computer security
Public-key cryptographers
Fellows of the Royal Society of Canada
International Association for Cryptologic Research fellows